Agrafa is a mountainous region in Evrytania and Karditsa regional units in mainland Greece, consisting mainly of small villages. It is the southernmost part of the Pindus range. There is also a municipality with the same name, the Municipality of Agrafa, but it covers only a small percentage of the area.

History

The Agrafa region is famous for its complete autonomy throughout the entire years of Ottoman occupation of central Greece. The word ágrafa literally translates to unwritten, which means unregistered or uncharted; because the Ottomans were unable to conquer this region, the area and its population were not recorded in the Sultan's tax register. As a result the people were usually free to conduct their business and customs as they pleased without Ottoman influence.

The fiercely independent spirit of its people, known as Agrafiotes, is matched by a harsh and forbidding landscape. The central Agrafiotis River valley is surrounded on three sides by a steep 2,000-metre wall of mountains, and on its south side the river drains via a series of narrow and often impassable gorges into the man-made Lake Kremasta. The other great river of Agrafa, Tavropos (aka Megdovas), feeds two man-made lakes: Plastiras (N) and Kremasta (S).

Most of the surrounding forests in the region were controlled by Greek Orthodox monasteries for many hundreds of years and through Ottoman rule. The residents of the Agrafa purchased tracts of land from the monasteries hundreds of years ago and these forests remain in the communal hands of the current inhabitants.

Agrafa was a centre of literacy during the 400 years of Ottoman rule. Unlike the majority of Greeks, many Agrafiotes can trace their family histories back for generations.

In the 20th century, a lot of Agrafiotes left their villages and settled in the major metropolitan cities in Greece as well as in the United States, Canada, Australia and Germany, seeking an escape from the abject poverty and lack of opportunities in the area. The migration from the region first began in the 1920s and nearly ceased after the military junta which had ruled Greece from 1967–1974 was toppled.

Modernization 
Before modernization, most people's occupations in the Agrafa involved harvesting nuts and fruits from orchards, farming, shepherding, and textile manufacturing.  Most of the produce from the Agrafa are traditional cold weather crops or crops which can survive in poor soil. The proceeds of the timber sales from the forests purchased from the monasteries continue to benefit the community as a whole.

The most famous person from the Agrafa and the driving force behind modernization was the colonel Nikolaos Plastiras, who was elected prime minister of Greece after the Civil War. It was his vision to create a hydroelectric dam in the region so that nearly all of mainland Greece, excluding the Peloponnese, would be supplied with electricity, particularly the many fractured villages and rural communities. A spin-off from this project was the mass irrigation system developed to supply the farmers in the plains of Thessaly with water and increase the yields of cash crops such as cotton, and also the creation of Lake Plastira which has met increasing tourist development in the last decades.

Construction began during the 1950s. The Plastiras Dam contributed to the economic development of Greece.  The majority of the workers on this project were Agrafiotes themselves. The residents of the region enjoy free water up until this day.

Notes

References
Alexakis, Christoforos . Literacy at the Agrafa Region during the Turkish Occupation. Athens, 2001.

External links

Plastiras Lake